Asimoneura shirakii is a species of tephritid or fruit flies in the genus Trypeta of the family Tephritidae.

Distribution
Taiwan.

References

Tephritinae
Insects described in 1935
Diptera of Asia